KPXC-TV (channel 59) is a television station in Denver, Colorado, United States, affiliated with Ion Television. Owned by Inyo Broadcast Holdings, the station maintains offices on South Jamaica Court in Aurora, and its transmitter is located in rural southwestern Weld County, east of Frederick.

History
The station first signed on the air on September 10, 1987, as KUBD. Originally operating as an independent station, the station aired financial news programming from the Financial News Network during the daytime hours and ran a general entertainment schedule at night. In 1989, KUBD became the original Denver area affiliate of the Spanish-language network Telemundo. FNN ceased operations two years later, when it was absorbed by CNBC. In 1995, KUBD was sold by its original ownership group (which included satellite TV entrepreneur Charlie Ergen) to Christian Network, Inc. (CNI), a non-profit organization co-founded by Bud Paxson, for $6.5 million. That year, KUBD switched to infomercial programming from inTV, and Telemundo programming moved to KSBS-TV (now KRMZ). The CNI stations, including KUBD, were sold to Paxson Communications in 1996.

The station changed its call letters to KPXC-TV on February 2, 1998; KPXC became a charter owned-and-operated station of Paxson's new family-oriented broadcast network Pax TV (now Ion Television) when the network launched on August 31, 1998. In 2001, KPXC obtained the local television rights to carry select NHL games featuring the Colorado Avalanche; the deal to broadcast the games ended in 2003.

On December 15, 2014, Ion reached a deal to donate KPXC-TV's low-power repeater in Fort Collins, KPXH-LD (channel 25), to Word of God Fellowship, parent company of the Daystar network.

Newscasts
In September 2001, as part of its joint sales agreement with that station (the result of an overall deal between Pax TV and NBC), KPXC-TV began airing tape delayed rebroadcasts of Gannett's NBC affiliate KUSA-TV (channel 9)'s 6:00 and 10:00 p.m. newscasts each Monday through Friday evening at 6:30 and 10:30 p.m. (the latter beginning shortly before that program's live broadcast ended on KUSA). The news rebroadcasts ended on June 30, 2005, when the network's other news share agreements with major network affiliates throughout the United States were terminated upon the network's rebranding as i: Independent Television, as a result of the network's financial troubles.

Technical information

Subchannels  
The station's digital signal is multiplexed:

Analog-to-digital conversion
KPXC-TV shut down its analog signal, over UHF channel 59, on June 12, 2009, the official date in which full-power television stations in the United States transitioned from analog to digital broadcasts under federal mandate. The station's digital signal remained on its pre-transition UHF channel 43. Through the use of PSIP, digital television receivers display the station's virtual channel as its former UHF analog channel 59, which was among the high band UHF channels (52–69) that were removed from broadcasting use as a result of the transition.

References

External links

Ion Television affiliates
PXC-TV
Bounce TV affiliates
Court TV affiliates
Defy TV affiliates
TrueReal affiliates
Grit (TV network) affiliates
Scripps News affiliates
Television channels and stations established in 1987
1987 establishments in Colorado
National Hockey League over-the-air television broadcasters